Bunny Whipped is a 2007 direct-to-DVD superhero comedy film written and directed by Rafael Riera.

Plot summary
Bob Whipple (Esteban Powell) is a sportswriter stuck in a dead-end job. When he learns of the murder of high-profile white rapper Cracker Jack (Fred Maske), he is inspired to become the vigilante not-so-superhero The Whip. Whipple's high-school girlfriend Anne (Joey Lauren Adams), now an animal-rights activist, reaches out to The Whip to help rescue rabbits, but she is soon kidnapped by Kenny Kent (Laz Alonso), who is also the prime suspect in the rapper's murder. In spite of his complete lack of superpowers, The Whip jumps into action to save Anne and avenge the rapper's death.

Cast
Esteban Powell as Bob Whipple/The Whip
Joey Lauren Adams as Anne
Laz Alonso as Kenny Kent 
Brande Roderick as Casey
Rebecca Gayheart as Miss Most Awesomely Awesome
Fred Maske as Cracker Jack
Pedro Miguel Arce as Security Guard 
Ike Barinholtz as Joe 
Eric Bradley as Additional Voices
Jake Johnson as Basketball Player
Amanda Noret as Jennifer

Reception
DVDTalk's David Cornelius referred to the film as "a plotless, plodding comedy made on the cheap". Adam Jones from FILMINK said "With a muddled storyline and appalling character development, one can only hope that writer/director Rafael Riera isn't allowed near a movie camera again!" Other reviewers said "it seemed like a 12 year old spliced it together" and "the filmmaking and acting is shabby and rough at best".

References

External links
 
 

2007 films
American action comedy films
Films shot in Los Angeles
2000s superhero comedy films
2007 action comedy films
2007 comedy films
2000s English-language films
2000s American films